Agdistis protai is a moth in the family Pterophoridae. It is known from Italy (Tuscany, Sardinia), Cyprus and Turkey.

Adults are on wing in July and August.

References

Agdistinae
Moths of Europe
Moths described in 1973